The 2004 Lehigh Mountain Hawks football team was an American football team that represented Lehigh University during the 2004 NCAA Division I-AA football season. Lehigh won the Patriot League co-championship but lost in the first round of the national playoffs. 

In their fourth year under head coach Pete Lembo, the Mountain Hawks compiled a 9–3 record. Kaloma Cardwell, Karrie Ford, Jason Morrell and Justin Terry were the team captains.

The Mountain Hawks outscored opponents 345 to 193. Their 5–1 conference record tied for best in the Patriot League standings. Though their co-champion Lafayette was awarded the Patriot League's automatic berth in the national Division I-AA playoffs, Lehigh qualified as an at-large selection. Both Patriot League representatives lost their first-round games.

Lehigh was ranked No. 23 in the preseason national Division I-AA poll, and remained ranked throughout the season. The Mountain Hawks' ranking peaked at No. 8 in mid-November, but losses to archrival Lafayette and in the first round of the playoffs dropped them to No. 15 in the postseason poll.

Lehigh played its home games, including its one playoff game, at Goodman Stadium on the university's Goodman Campus in Bethlehem, Pennsylvania.

Schedule

References

Lehigh
Lehigh Mountain Hawks football seasons
Patriot League football champion seasons
Lehigh Mountain Hawks football